Charles Bruneau (1883–1969) was a French grammarian, linguist and philologist.

Biography 

Bruneau grew up in a village where the language of communication was Walloon, but surrounded by areas where the regional language was Champenois. This prompted him, at the instigation of Jules Gilliéron, to conduct dialectological surveys throughout the region around Givet, both in France and Belgium. He was a grammar scholar (1906) and doctor of letters (1913).

His research was published in four books:

 Étude phonétique des patois d’Ardenne (1913), where he explained the phonetic notation system he would use.
 La limite des dialectes wallon, champenois et lorrain en Ardenne (1913) where he traced the boundaries of the three regional languages in question ( Walloon , Champenois and Lorrain).
 Enquête linguistique sur les patois d’Ardenne, volume I (1914), where he gave the dialect forms, collected in his 93 locations, for the French words ranging from A to L (940 words, from abaisser to luzerne).
 Enquête linguistique sur les patois d’Ardenne, volume II (1926), idem for the rest of the alphabet (764 words, from ma to y).

Charles Bruneau took over Ferdinand Brunot's  l’Histoire de la langue française after his death, publishing volumes xii and xiii (1948-1972). He also resumed and recast Précis de grammaire historique de la langue française, following which it was known as "Brunot and Bruneau".

He had four children, including Anne, mother of Pascal Quignard, and Jean, an academic expert on Gustave Flaubert.

References 

1883 births
1969 deaths
Grammarians from France
Linguists from France
French philologists
People from Givet
20th-century linguists
20th-century philologists